Associazione Sportiva Dilettantistica Hockey Breganze is a roller hockey team from Breganze, Italy.

History
Hockey Breganze was founded in 1961 with the name of Polisportiva CSI Breganze. The golden years of the club were in the 1970s, when it won the two Italian leagues that currently owns.

In the 2000s, Breganze consolidated as one of the top Italian clubs and uses to play European competitions.

Honours

Italian Championship: 2
 1975–76, 1978–79
Coppa Italia: 4
 1968, 1975, 2015, 2019
Italian Supercup: 1
 2016

External links
Official Website

Roller hockey clubs in Italy
Sports clubs established in 1961
1961 establishments in Italy